D. S. Senanayake College ( டி.எஸ் சேனாநாயக்க கல்லூரி D. S. Senanayaka Vidyalaya, also referred to as DS and DSSC) is a boys' primary and secondary national school in Cinnamon Gardens, Colombo, Western Province, Sri Lanka. It was established on 10 February 1967 under the stewardship of R. I. T. Alles, and was named after the first Prime Minister of Sri Lanka, D. S. Senanayake.

It provides education from Grades 1 to 13 in Sinhalese, Tamil and English language. It is the only muti-ethnic, trilingual school established in Sri Lanka in the post-independence era and the largest multi-ethnic school in the country. Its street name was formerly known as Gregory Road but was renamed to R. G. Senanayake Mawatha in 2013.

History 
In 1965, the number of requests to admit children into the Royal College Primary had become excessive. Thus the Minister of Education I. M. R. A. Iriyagolla took the initiative to build a new school in Cinnamon Gardens on the lines of Royal College, Colombo. In 1967, Minister Iriyagolla began the ground work for establishing the school. It was named after D. S. Senanayake, who was the first Prime Minister of Sri Lanka (then Ceylon) after gaining independence. R. I. T. Alles, an assistant principal at Royal College became the head teacher of the new school. The location in which the college stands today was at that time called the Kumbikale jungle.

As a resolution the Ministry of Education had taken a decision to increase the number of primary schools, to meet with the increasing demand of parents enrolling their children to Colombo schools. The secretary of the Ministry of Education and Cultural Affairs, M. J. Perera, was assigned to find a suitable plot of land to start the new school. Accordingly the empty plot of land situated down the Gregory's road normally "Kubi Kelle" adjoining Kinsy road was selected for the purpose with another land bounded the said premises which belonged to the Ministry of Defense and also was acquired building plans were prepared and implemented by the state engineering co - operation.

Alles who had been an assistant teacher at Royal College had been appointed as the principal of D. S. Senanayake College. He was helped by the principal of Royal College, B. Premarathne. The cadet platoon of the Royal College also cleaned the land holding a shramadana. Five assistant teachers and office equipment were donated by the Royal College.

Coat of arms 

The school's coat of arms is a shield which is partitioned into two parts. The upper section has the lion of the Sri Lankan flag and the lower section has an oil lamp. A wreath of paddy is partially encircling the shield and the motto "Country Before Self" is in a scroll. Some decades back, the crown of the Kandyan monarch which is depicted in the crest of Royal College, Colombo, was depicted in the school's crest as well.

Principals of D. S. Senanayake College since 1967

1967 - 1982 
R. I. T. Alles

1982 - 1984 
P. Samaranayake

1984 - 1989 
S. M. A. J. A. Mayadunne

1989 - 1992 
R. I. T. Alles

1992 - 1995 
Somabandu Kodikara

1995 - 1999 
G. C. Adikari

1999 - 2010 
Asoka Senani Hewage

2010 - 2016 
D. M. D. Dissanayake

2016 - 2018 
R. M. M. Rathnayake

2019 - 2020 
Interregnum

2020 - 2023 
Prasanna Udumuhandiram

2023 - present 
Sampath Weragoda

Houses 
The school has a house system comprising four houses. Students are allocated to a house according to their admission number. They compete each year to win the Inter-house Competitions.
  – Shura (ශූර)
  – Meththa (මෙත්ත)
  – Weera (වීර)
  – Shantha (ශාන්ත)

The Old Boys Association (OBA)

The first batch of students left the college in 1979 and the OBA was formed thereafter. The first president of the Association was Ranjan Perera, CEO of SoftLogic. OBA celebrated its 25th year in 2005.

School Flag 

The colour of the school flag, royal gold and black which symbolises discipline was suggested by the founding principal, R. I. T. Alles, and the school logo was also designed according to his idea. The lion in the in the logo symbolises the bravery of students, the lamp wisdom and two bunches of paddy symbolise prosperity.

Hostel 

The school has a hostel which provides accommodation to over 200 students. The hostel was opened in January 2003 by the Minister of Education, Karunasena Kodituwakku. The students were admitted to the hostel for the first time in February 2003. It officially opened doors on the 10 February 2003, which was the 36th birthday of the school.

The first housemaster was J. A. K. Janakantha and the first deputy principal who resided was S. A. Galappaththi. At the beginning 25 hostellers were accommodated and by 2009 the number of hostellers accommodated was more than one hundred. 2010 enrollment was 129 wards.

In 2006 D. M. D. Dissanayake resided at the hostel as the deputy principal, who was appointed as the principal in September 2010. The first Warden appointed to the hostel by the Ministry of Education was Roy Nalinda in 2009.

School magazine

Siyapatha is the official publication of the college, published by Media Circle. It began in 2001 and is published quarterly.

Notable alumni

References

External links 

  
 
 Class of 1989 alumni website
 Siyapatha Magazine
Schools in Colombo
National schools in Sri Lanka
Educational institutions established in 1967
1967 establishments in Ceylon
Boys' schools in Sri Lanka